Tongue River may refer to:

Tongue River (North Dakota), U.S.
Tongue River (Montana), a tributary of the Yellowstone River, in the U.S. states of Wyoming and Montana
Tongue River Dam
Tongue River Indian Reservation
Tongue River Reservoir State Park
Tongue River Railroad, a proposed rail line
Tongue River (Texas), U.S.

See also
 Tongue River Cave, in Dayton, Wyoming, U.S.
 Tongue River Member, a geologic member of the Fort Union Formation in North Dakota and Wyoming
 Tongue River Massacre (1820)
 Battle of the Tongue River, 1865
 Tongue Wash, in Nevada, U.S.